Infant baptism (or paedobaptism) is the practice of baptising infants or young children. Infant baptism is also called christening by some faith traditions.  

Most Christians belong to denominations that practice infant baptism. Branches of Christianity that practice infant baptism include Catholicism, Eastern Orthodoxy, and Oriental Orthodoxy. Among Protestants, several denominations practice it, including Anglicans, Lutherans, Presbyterians, Congregationalists Methodists, Nazarenes, Moravians, and United Protestants.

Christians who do not practice infant baptism are called credobaptists.

Ceremony  
The exact details of the baptismal ceremony vary among Christian denominations. Many follow a prepared ceremony, called a rite or liturgy. In a typical ceremony, parents or godparents bring their child to their congregation's priest or minister. The rite used would be the same as that denomination's rite for adults, i.e., by pouring holy water (affusion) or by sprinkling water (aspersion). Eastern Orthodox and Eastern Catholic traditions practise total immersion and baptise babies in a font, and this practice is also the first method listed in the baptismal ritual of the Roman Catholic, although pouring is the standard practice within the Latin branch of Catholicism. Catholic and Orthodox churches that do this do not sprinkle. At the moment of baptism, the minister utters the words "I baptise you (or, 'The servant of God (name) is baptised') in the name of the Father, and of the Son, and of the Holy Spirit" (see Matthew 28:19).

Although it is not required, many parents and godparents choose to dress the baby in a white gown called a christening gown for the baptism ceremony. Christening gowns often become treasured keepsakes that are used by many other children in the family and handed down from generation to generation. Traditionally, this gown is white or slightly off white and made with much lace, trim and intricate detail. In the past, a gown was used for both boys and girls; in the present day it has become more common to dress children in a baptismal outfit. Also normally made of white fabric, the outfit consists of a romper with a vest or other accessories. These clothes are often kept as a memento after the ceremony.

History

Antiquity 
Scholars disagree on the date when infant baptism was first practiced. Some believe that 1st-century Christians did not practice it, noting the lack of any explicit evidence of infant baptism. Others, noting the lack of any explicit evidence of exclusion of infant baptism, believe that they did, understanding biblical references to individuals "and [her] household" being baptised as including young children.

The earliest extra-biblical directions for baptism, which occur in the Didache (c. 100), are taken to be about baptism of adults, since they require fasting by the person to be baptised. However, inscriptions dating back to the 2nd century which refer to young children as "children of God" may indicate that Christians customarily baptised infants too. The earliest reference to infant baptism was by Irenaeus (c. 130–202) in his work Against Heresies. Due to its reference to Eleutherus as the current bishop of Rome, the work is usually dated . Irenaeus speaks of children being "born again to God." Three passages by Origen (185–c. 254) mention infant baptism as traditional and customary. While Tertullian writing c. 198–203 advises the postponement of baptism of little children and the unmarried, he mentions that it was customary to baptise infants, with sponsors speaking on their behalf. The Apostolic Tradition, sometimes attributed to Hippolytus of Rome (died 235), describes how to perform the ceremony of baptism; it states that children were baptised first, and if any of them could not answer for themselves, their parents or someone else from their family was to answer for them.

From at least the 3rd century onward Christians baptised infants as standard practice, although some preferred to postpone baptism until late in life, so as to ensure forgiveness for all their preceding sins.

Theology

Agreements among infant-baptizers 
Based on their understanding of New Testament passages such as Colossians 2:11–12, Christians who baptize infants believe that infant baptism is the New Testament counterpart to the Old Testament circumcision. In the Old Testament, all male converts to Judaism, male infants born to Jewish parents, and male servants were circumcised as ceremony of initiation into the Jewish community. Christians who baptize infants believe that baptism has replaced Old Testament circumcision and is the religious ceremony of initiation into the Christian community.

During the medieval and Reformation eras, infant baptism was seen as a way to incorporate newborn babies into the secular community as well as inducting them into the Christian faith. Due to high rates of infant mortality, it is important to note that canon law denied unbaptized infants a Christian burial in sacred ground.

Teachings of Christian denominations practicing infant baptism

Different Christian denominations who practice infant baptism attach different meanings to the sacrament and explain its efficacy in different ways.

Roman Catholic Church 
The Roman Catholic Church considers baptism, even for an infant, so important that "parents are obliged to see that their infants are baptized within the first few weeks" and, "if the infant is in danger of death, it is to be baptized without any delay." It declares: "The practice of infant Baptism is an immemorial tradition of the Church. There is explicit testimony to this practice from the second century on, and it is quite possible that, from the beginning of the apostolic preaching, when whole 'households' received baptism, infants may also have been baptized". It notes that "when the first direct evidence of infant Baptism appears in the second century, it is never presented as an innovation", that 2nd-century Irenaeus treated baptism of infants as a matter of course, and that, "at a Synod of African Bishops, St. Cyprian stated that 'God's mercy and grace should not be refused to anyone born', and the Synod, recalling that 'all human beings' are 'equal', whatever be 'their size or age', declared it lawful to baptize children 'by the second or third day after their birth'". In the 17th and 18th centuries, many infants were baptized on the day of their birth as in the cases of Francoise-Athenais, Marquise de Montespan, Jeanne Du Barry and Marie Anne de Cupis de Camargo. Infant baptism is seen as showing very clearly that salvation is an unmerited favour from God, not the fruit of human effort. "Born with a fallen human nature and tainted by original sin, children also have need of the new birth in Baptism to be freed from the power of darkness and brought into the realm of the freedom of the children of God, to which all men are called . . . The Church and the parents would deny a child the priceless grace of becoming a child of God were they not to confer Baptism shortly after birth".

The Church has no dogmatic official teaching regarding the fate of infants who die without baptism, and theologians of the Church hold various views (in particular, many have asserted that they go to Limbo). "The Church entrusts these infants to the mercy of God."

The Congregation for the Doctrine of the Faith issued on 20 October 1980 an instruction on infant baptism, whose purpose was "to recall the principal points of doctrine in this field which justify the Church's constant practice down the centuries and demonstrate its permanent value in spite of the difficulties raised today". The document then indicated some general guidelines for pastoral action.

The document recalled that infant baptism has long been considered of apostolic origin and that the first direct evidence of its practice, dating from the 2nd century, does not present it as an innovation. It then responded to objections that baptism should follow faith, that the person baptized should consciously receive the grace of the sacrament, that the person should freely accept baptism, that infant baptism is unsuitable in a society marked by instability of values and conflicts of ideas, and that the practice is inimical to a missionary outlook on the part of the Church.

The instruction then gave guidelines for pastoral practice, based on two principles. The major principle is that baptism, as the sign and means of God's love that precedes any action on our part and that frees from original sin and communicates divine life, must not be delayed. The subordinate principle is that assurances must be given that the gift thus granted can grow by authentic education in the faith and Christian life. If these assurances are not really serious, there can be grounds for delaying baptism. If they are certainly absent, the sacrament should even be refused.

Accordingly, the rules for involvement on the part of practicing Christian parents must be supplemented with other considerations in the case of "families with little faith or non-Christian families". If these request that a child of theirs be baptized, there must be assurances that the child will be given the benefit of the Christian upbringing required by the sacrament. Examples of such assurances are "the choice of godparents who will take sincere care of the child, or the support of the community". If there is satisfactory assurance, i.e., "any pledge giving a well-founded hope for the Christian upbringing of the children", then "the priest cannot refuse to celebrate the sacrament without delay, as in the case of children of Christian families". If there is insufficient assurance, "it will be prudent to delay baptism", while keeping contact with the parents in the hope of securing the required conditions for celebrating the sacrament. As a last resort, enrollment of the child in a course of catechetical instruction on reaching school age can be offered in lieu of immediate celebration of baptism. The possibility of delaying infant baptism in the case of non practicing or non believing parents raises a number of questions.  How can we discern that there are guarantees of an authentic Christian education?  Can a priest propose an alternative celebration in the case where baptism is to be delayed?  In some German speaking countries, bishops have opened the door to a "two step baptism", i.e. two celebrations separated by a time of evangelization of the parents.  In this case, the rite of baptism itself is to be performed in the second celebration, when parents are supposed to have enough maturity to raise the child in the Catholic faith.

The Catechism of the Catholic Church states: "Since Baptism signifies liberation from sin and from its instigator the devil, one or more exorcisms are pronounced over the candidate". In the Roman Rite, the wording of the prayer of exorcism is: "Almighty and ever-living God, you sent your only Son into the world to cast out the power of Satan, spirit of evil, to rescue man from the kingdom of darkness and bring him into the splendour of your kingdom of light. We pray for this child: set him (her) free from original sin, make him (her) a temple of your glory, and send your Holy Spirit to dwell with him (her). Through Christ our Lord."

Eastern Orthodoxy, Oriental Orthodoxy and the Church of the East 

The Eastern Orthodox Church, Oriental Orthodoxy and the Assyrian Church of the East also insist on the need to have infants baptized as soon as is practicable after birth. Similar to the Roman Catholic Church, they teach that baptism is not merely a symbol but actually conveys grace. Baptism is a sacrament because it is an "instrument" instituted by Jesus Christ to impart grace to its recipients. Infants are traditionally baptized on the eighth day, recalling the biblical injunction to circumcise on the eighth day. However, this is not mandatory. In many of these churches, the Sacred Mystery of Chrismation (Confirmation) is administered by the priest immediately after baptism. Holy Communion, in the form of consecrated wine and bread, is also given to infants after they are baptized.

Lutheran Churches 

Lutherans practice infant baptism because they believe that God mandates it through the instruction of Jesus Christ, "Go and make disciples of all nations, baptizing them in the name of the Father and of the Son and of the Holy Spirit", in which Jesus does not set any age limit:

They also cite other biblical passages such as Mark 10:13-15, Mark 16:16, John 3:3-7 and Acts 2:38-39 in support of their position. For example, in the Acts of the Apostles Saint Peter's teachings on Pentecost included children in the promise of Baptism, "Repent and be baptized, every one of you, in the name of Jesus Christ for the forgiveness of your sins. And you will receive the gift of the Holy Spirit. The promise is for you and your children".

For them baptism is a "means of grace" through which God creates and strengthens "saving faith" as the "washing of regeneration" in which people are reborn (John 3:3–7): "baptismal regeneration". Since the creation of faith is exclusively God's work, it does not depend on the actions of the one baptised, whether infant or adult. Even though baptized infants cannot articulate that faith, Lutherans believe that it is present all the same. Because it is faith alone that receives these divine gifts, Lutherans confess that baptism "works forgiveness of sins, delivers from death and the devil, and gives eternal salvation to all who believe this, as the words and promises of God declare". In the special section on infant baptism in his Large Catechism Luther argues that infant baptism is God-pleasing because persons so baptized were reborn and sanctified by the Holy Spirit.

Methodist Churches 

In the Methodist Churches, baptism is a sacrament of initiation into the visible Church. Wesleyan covenant theology further teaches that baptism is a sign and a seal of the covenant of grace:
 
Infant baptism, in Methodism, is celebrated as "an acceptance of the prevenient grace of God and as a confession on the part of the church of its responsibility for children in general and for every child in particular." Methodists teach that people receive justifying grace, which is integral to salvation, after they repent and personally accept Jesus as Saviour. Many Methodist denominations, such as the Free Methodist Church and Allegheny Wesleyan Methodist Connection, practice infant baptism for families who desire it for their children, but provide a rite for child dedication for those who have a preference for credobaptism only after their child has made a personal acceptance of Jesus as his/her saviour.

Presbyterian, Congregational and Reformed Churches 

Presbyterian, Congregational and Reformed Christians believe that baptism, whether of infants or adults, is a "sign and seal of the covenant of grace", and that baptism admits the party baptized into the visible church. Being a member of the visible church does not guarantee salvation; though it does provide the child with many benefits, including that of one's particular congregation consenting to assist in the raising of that child in "the way he should go, (so that) when he is old he will not turn from it".  Elect infants (those predestined for salvation) who die in infancy are by faith considered regenerate on the basis of God's covenant promises in the covenant of grace.

Presbyterian, Congregational and many Reformed Christians see infant baptism as the New Testament form of circumcision in the Jewish covenant. Circumcision did not create faith in the 8-day-old Jewish boy. It merely marked him as a member of God's covenant people Israel. Likewise, baptism doesn't create faith; it is a sign of membership in the visible covenant community.

Presbyterian, Congregational and Reformed Christians consider children of professing Christians to be members of the visible Church (the covenant community). They also consider them to be full members of the local congregation where their parents are members and members of the universal Church (the set of all true believers who make up the invisible church) unless and until they prove otherwise. Baptism is the mark of membership in the covenant of grace and in the universal church, although regeneration is not inseparably connected with baptism.

Contrasts between infant and adult baptism
Infant baptism can be contrasted with what is called "believer's baptism" (or credobaptism, from the Latin word credo meaning "I believe"), which is the religious practice of baptising only individuals who personally confess faith in Jesus, therefore excluding underage children. 

Pedobaptism and credobaptism are positions which bubble up from theological views at a more fundamental level of one's theological system.
 If baptism is a sign that a person is a member of God's covenant community, and if the children of believers are members of that community, it follows that the children of believers should receive the sign that they are members of God's covenant community by being baptized, as an infant is entitled to a passport that indicates the child as a member of a particular country.
 Believers and the children of believers become members of God's covenant community (or church) through baptism.
 It is believed by some Christians that in the heart of a baptized child, faith as a gift or grace from God, as distinct from an act by the person, is made present.
 It is believed by some Christians that baptism is not merely a symbol and that it has a real effect, conveying divine grace.

Arguments for infant baptism 

Christians who practice infant baptism do not completely agree on the reasons for doing so, and offer different reasons in support of the practice. Among the arguments made in support of the practice are:

 Analogy with circumcision: Some Christians posit an analogy of baptism to circumcision, pointing to children, since the historic Israelite application of circumcision was to infants, not to adult converts, of which there were few. Covenant theology identifies baptism less as a statement of faith than as an assumption of identity; that is to say that infant baptism is a sign of covenantal inclusion. Assuming that what God instituted in the Old Testament continues unless the New Testament specifically abrogates it, including infants in the giving of the sign of the covenant must continue in the New Covenant. It is especially so if the practice is an important one.
 Jesus' affirmation: According to Luke 18:15-17, when parents brought their babies to Jesus, the disciples tried to prevent them from coming. Jesus becomes indignant and says, "Let the little children come to me, and do not hinder them, for the kingdom of God belongs to such as these." This seems to confirm that infants can have a personal relationship with Jesus just as parents can have a personal relationship with their babies. More importantly, Jesus confirms that babies of believers belong to the kingdom of God. In other words, babies of believers are counted as believers, not unbelievers. Therefore, Jesus specifically instructs not to hinder them.
 Peter's speech: According to the Book of Acts, "Peter replied, 'Repent and be baptized, every one of you, in the name of Jesus Christ for the forgiveness of your sins. And you will receive the gift of the Holy Spirit. The promise is for you and your children and for all who are far off—for all whom the Lord our God will call.'" (Acts 2:38–39, NIV–UK, emphasis added) Some churches within The United Methodist Church argue that the phrase "every one of you" recalls the use of the same phrase in Deuteronomy 29:10–12, where there is explicit mention of the "little ones" present; and it takes the phrase "and your children" to mean that Peter included children in the covenant community.
 Early Christian practice: Several early Church Fathers seem to have taught that infant baptism is proper; Origen states that the practice of baptising infants is of apostolic origin.

Arguments against infant baptism 
 Infants cannot repent or believe: Baptism in Scripture always has the prerequisite of repentance and faith, which are impossible for an infant.
 No scriptural instances: There are no explicit instances of infant baptism in the scripture

Denominations and religious groups opposed to infant baptism
Trinitarian Christian denominations that oppose infant baptism include the International Christian Church, all Baptist and Anabaptist traditions and denominations, Pentecostals, Assemblies of God and more. 

Several nontrinitarian religious groups also oppose infant baptism, including Oneness Pentecostals, Christadelphians, Jehovah's Witnesses, United Church of God, and the Church of Jesus Christ of Latter-day Saints.

B.R. White describes the motivations behind persecution of the Anabaptists during the Reformation as follows:
Other Christians saw the baptism of each new-born baby into the secular parish community and close links between church and state as the divinely-ordained means of holding society together. Hence many other Christians saw the Anabaptists as subversive of all order. Consequently, from the earliest days, they were sharply persecuted and leaders were soon executed.

The Church of Jesus Christ of Latter-day Saints (LDS Church) completely rejects infant baptism. Little children are considered both born without sin and incapable of committing sin. They have no need of baptism until age eight, when they can begin to learn to discern right from wrong, and are thus accountable to God for their own actions. However, the LDS Church performs a non-saving ordinance to name and bless children, customarily performed on infants.

Confirmation 

For Roman Catholic and Methodist Christians, Confirmation "strengthens" (the original meaning of the word "confirm") the grace of Baptism, by conferring an increase and deepening of that grace.

In Eastern Christianity, including the Eastern Catholic Churches, the sacrament of Confirmation is conferred immediately after baptism, and there is no renewal of baptismal promises. In the Latin Church and its Latin liturgical rites of the Catholic Church, the sacrament is to be conferred at about the age of discretion (generally taken to be about 7), unless the Episcopal Conference has decided on a different age, or there is danger of death or, in the judgement of the minister, a grave reason suggests otherwise (canon 891 of the Code of Canon Law). The renewal of baptismal promises by those receiving the sacrament in the Western Catholic Church is incidental to the rite and not essentially different from the solemn renewal of their baptismal promises that is asked of all members of this Church each year at the Easter Vigil service. Only in French-speaking countries has there been a development of ceremonies, quite distinct from the sacrament of Confirmation, for young Catholics to profess their faith publicly, in line with their age.

Within the Church of Jesus Christ of Latter-day Saints, confirmation or "the laying on of hands" is an essential part of the baptismal ordinance, and to receive baptism without confirmation is to leave the ordinance incomplete. Confirmation is the conferring of the gift of the Holy Ghost as a constant companion. To confirm means to "make more sure" and the ordinance of confirmation stands as a witness of the individual becoming a member of the LDS Church and not just an acceptance of Jesus.

Opposition to infant baptism 
According to legal professor and former Irish president Mary McAleese, as outlined in her doctoral thesis, infant baptism amounts to "enforced membership of the Catholic Church", which violates fundamental rights of children. These "infant conscripts ... are held to lifelong obligations of obedience" without their understanding or consent. "Parents can guide and direct [their children] but they can't impose, and what the church has failed to do is to recognise that there has to be a point at which our young people, as adults who have been baptised into the church and raised in the faith, have the chance to say 'I validate this' or 'I repudiate this'. You and I know, we live now in times where we have the right to freedom of conscience, freedom of belief, freedom of opinion, freedom of religion and freedom to change religion. The Catholic Church yet has to fully embrace that thinking."

Controversies 
Baptisms have sometimes accidentally led to injuries, or deaths, such as drowning deaths, to babies. In Romania, this has served as an opportunity to revise practices.

Yazidi baptism 

In Yazidism, children are baptised at birth and circumcision is not required, but is practised by some due to regional customs. The Yazidi baptism is called Mor kirin (literally: 'to seal'). Traditionally, Yazidi children are baptised at birth with water from the Kaniya Sipî ('White Spring') at Lalish. It involves pouring holy water from the spring on the child's head three times.

See also 

 Anabaptists
 Baptism
 Believer's baptism
 Sacraments of initiation
 Infant communion
 William Wall (theologian)
 Aqiqah

References

External links

Support 
 Early Church Fathers on Baptism
 What About Holy Baptism? by Dr. A.L. Barry (Lutheran perspective)
 Baptism by Francis Schaeffer (Evangelical Presbyterian perspective)
 Infant Baptism by Greg Johnson (Evangelical Presbyterian perspective)
 INFANT BAPTISM: How My Mind Has Changed by Dr. Dennis E. Johnson (Conservative Presbyterian perspective)
 JEREMIAH 31: INFANT BAPTISM IN THE NEW COVENANT by Dr. Richard Pratt (Evangelical Presbyterian perspective)
  (Reformed Presbyterian perspective)
 Instruction on Infant Baptism (Roman Catholic Church)
 Infant Baptism Catholic Answers guide, with Imprimatur
 Early Teachings of Infant Baptism teachings on Baptism by the Church Fathers, with Imprimatur
 Infant Baptism (by Jordan Bajis, Greek Orthodox Archdiocese of America website)
 Infant Baptism by Canon Tom Gordon (Orthodox Anglican perspective)
 By Water and the Spirit (United Methodist perspective)
 Donatist, Anabaptist, and Presbyterian Confusion: Infant Baptism Among Evangelicals by Nollie Malabuyo (Conservative Reformed Presbyterian perspective)
 Infant Baptism discussed at www.CatholicBridge.com (Roman Catholic perspective)
 Baptism, Confirmation and the Affirmation of Baptismal Faith (Anglican Church perspective)

Opposition 

 Infant Baptism in the Global Anabaptist Mennonite Encyclopedia Online
 A Scriptural Critique of Infant Baptism by Pastor John MacArthur
 The Assemblies of God on Baptism

Baptism
Baptism
Christianity and children
Christian terminology
Limbo